Lomandra, commonly known as mat rushes, is a genus of perennial, herbaceous monocots in the family Asparagaceae, subfamily Lomandroideae. There are 51 species, all of which are native to Australia; two of them also extend into New Guinea and New Caledonia.

They are generally tufted dioecious perennials with long narrow blade-like leaves that arise from a central stemless base and have thick woody rhizomes and fibrous roots.

Taxonomy
Now in the Asparagaceae, this genus was formerly assigned to the family Dasypogonaceae, Xanthorrhoeaceae, or Liliaceae.

Species
According to the World Checklist of Selected Plant Families, there are 51 species recognised :

References

 Lomandra. FloraBase, the Western Australia Flora. Retrieved 23 February 2007.
 Genus Lomandra. Germplasm Resources Information Network. United States Department of Agriculture. Retrieved 23 February 2007.

 
Asparagaceae genera
Asparagales of Australia
Dioecious plants